The Galápagos penguin (Spheniscus mendiculus) is a penguin endemic to the Galápagos Islands, Ecuador. It is the only penguin found north of the equator. Most inhabit Fernandina Island and the west coast of Isabela Island. The cool waters of the Humboldt and Cromwell Currents allow it to survive despite the tropical latitude. The Galápagos penguin is one of the banded penguins, the other species of which live mostly on the coasts of Africa and mainland South America. It is one of the smallest species of penguin in the world. Because of their warm environment, Galápagos penguins have developed techniques to stay cool. The feathers on their back, flippers, and head are black, and they have a white belly and a stripe looping from their eyes down to their neck and chin. Each penguin keeps only one mate, and breeds year-round. Their nests are typically in caves and crevices as protection against predators and the harsh environment. The Galápagos penguin has a lifespan of about 15 to 20 years, but due to predation, life expectancy in the wild could be significantly reduced.

Description
It is the second smallest species of penguin, after the little penguin. Females are usually smaller than males. Galápagos penguins have a black head with a white border running from behind the eye, around the black ear coverts and chin, to join on the throat. The top of the beaks are black and fade into pink on the bottom. They have two black bands across the breast that connect to the back, the lower band extending down the flanks to the thigh. Juveniles differ in having a wholly dark head, grayer on side and chin, and no breast band.

Distribution 
Ninety percent of Galápagos penguins live on Fernandina Island and the west coast of Isabela Island, in the western part of the archipelago, but small populations also occur on Santiago, Bartolomé, northern Santa Cruz, and Floreana. The northern tip of Isabela crosses the equator, meaning that some Galápagos penguins live in the Northern Hemisphere, the only penguins to do so.

Ecology and behavior
Galápagos penguins are confined to the Galápagos Islands, foraging in the cool Cromwell Current during the day and returning to the land at night. They eat small schooling fish, mainly mullet, sardines, pilchards and anchovies, and sometimes crustaceans. They normally range only a few kilometers from their breeding sites, depending on the cold, nutrient-rich currents to bring them food.

Air temperatures in the Galápagos remain in the range . During El Niño seasons, the penguins defer breeding because their food becomes less abundant; this makes the chances of raising offspring successfully unfavorable compared to the chances of dying in the attempt. This was especially detrimental during the 1982-83 El Niño, where a decline in population of 77% was observed. The penguins usually breed when the sea surface temperature is below . The strong tropical sun is problematic for this species. Their primary means of cooling off is going in the water, but other behavioral adaptations for thermoregulation come into play when they must remain on land. One method involves stretching out their flippers and hunching forward to keep the sun from shining on their feet, which exchange heat rapidly because they have high blood flow and lack insulation. Another method is to pant, using evaporation to cool the throat and airways. Galápagos penguins protect their eggs and chicks from the hot sun by keeping them in deep crevices in the rocks.

Breeding

Galápagos penguins are a monogamous species, each pair mating for life. There are fewer than 1,000 breeding pairs of Galápagos penguins in the world. After completing courtship, with rituals including bill dueling, flipper patting, and mutual preening, the pair will build and maintain a nest. Most nests are seen between May and July because both quantity of food and climate conditions are typically most optimal. The nests are made within  of the water on the shore. Adults stay near the breeding area during the year with their mate. It lays one or two eggs in places such as caves and crevices, protected from direct sunlight, which can cause the eggs to overheat. Incubation takes 38–40 days, with both parents incubating. One parent will always stay with the eggs or young chicks while the other may be absent for several days to feed. A pair usually rears only one chick. Galápagos penguins will molt before they breed, and are the only penguins to do this twice a year. Molting takes up to 15 days to complete. They do this for their own safety, as food availability in the Galápagos is typically unpredictable. If there is not enough food available, they may abandon the nest.

It takes about 60–65 days for the chicks to become independent. Newly hatched chicks have downy feathers that do not become waterproof until the chicks grow into juveniles. The juvenile plumage, attained by thirty days after a chick hatches, is dark brown or gray above and white below. These feathers are mainly needed to protect the chicks from the strong sun rather than keep them warm.

Bermudian naturalist Louis L. Mowbray was the first to successfully breed the Galápagos penguins in captivity.

Population 
Galápagos penguins have a lifespan ranging from 15 to 20 years, but because of environmental factors and predation, their life expectancy is reduced. They are listed on the IUCN Red List of Threatened Species as Endangered, and as of 2018 there are around 1,200 mature penguins left. It is currently the rarest penguin species (a status often falsely attributed to the yellow-eyed penguin).

Conservation

El Niño and climate change 
The Galápagos penguin is a particularly vulnerable bird species due to its limited range on the Galápagos Islands. With a population of only about 1800, it remains on the endangered species list, and its population will likely fluctuate strongly in response to anthropogenic changes in the region. The primary danger to the Galapagos penguin is the climate phenomena known as El Niño. In 1982-83 and 1997–98, two strong El Niño events resulted in Galapagos penguin population declines of 77% and 65%, respectively. Additionally, the years 1965-66, 1968–69, 1972–73, 1976, 1986–87, 1991–92 and 1993 all had relatively weak El Niño events which were associated with slow population recovery. Conversely, during La Niña events when sea surface temperatures are lower than normal and the climate patterns shift, Galapagos penguin populations begin to recover. Anthropogenic climate change has been shown to increase frequency and intensity of El Niño events beyond levels of natural variability which negatively impacts the Galapagos penguin. Warmer temperatures caused by El Niño are associated with poorer female condition and lower adult bodyweights. The warmer temperatures of El Niño events result in a decrease in upwelling of the cold nutrient rich waters which decreases phytoplankton productivity and results in bottom up trophic disruptions that reduce the food availability for the Galapagos penguin. This lack of food leads to poor breeding success and a disproportionate female death rate, causing population decline and disrupting future recovery by creating uneven sex ratios in the populations. Predictive models suggest future El Niño events will increase in frequency and severity over the next century, posing further threats to the Galapagos penguin. If the pattern of El Niño events from 1965-2004 continues, there is a 30% chance of extinction for the Galapagos penguin. If the frequency of strong El Niño events were to double over this same time period, the chance of extinction would be 80%.

Disease 
Another potential threat to the Galápagos penguin is disease. Preliminary studies, such as one conducted in 2001, found no evidence of Avian malaria or Marek’s disease in Galápagos penguin populations. Despite these findings, the researchers recommended further observations, citing the death of 800 chickens in the Galápagos Islands from Marek’s disease, the presence of mosquitos known to carry Avian malaria, and the known impacts of these diseases on other endemic bird populations in Hawaii. Later, a 2009 study revealed the presence of a species of Plasmodium in Galápagos penguins, the parasite genus that causes Avian malaria. The presence of this parasite suggests that diseases are able to travel from other populations to the isolated Galápagos penguin communities. Further research suggests that cross-species transmission may occur between endemic Galápagos species and migratory birds such as the Bobolink. Understanding how these diseases reach the Galápagos Islands and transmit between its bird species is a focus for developing conservation strategies for endangered species such as the Galápagos penguin.

Other 
Other threats include humans harvesting penguins for oil and other products, competition with fisheries for krill and other fish, habitat loss, increased predation from invasive species, bycatch, and pollution. On Isabela Island, humans may be contributing to the decline of this species due to introduced cats, dogs, and rats which attack penguins, destroy nests, and spread disease. Other threats on land include crabs, snakes, rice rats, Galápagos hawks, and short-eared owls. While in the water, predators include sharks, fur seals, and sea lions. They also face the hazards of unreliable food resources and volcanic activity. Illegal fishing activity may interrupt the penguins' nesting, and they are often caught in fishing nets by mistake.

These impacts are particularly threatening because of the population structure of the Galápagos penguin. The Galápagos penguin consists of two geographic subpopulations, but studies suggest that there is sufficient gene flow between these populations to treat them together when considering conservation strategies. Additionally, the Galápagos penguin demonstrates relatively low genetic diversity, making it especially vulnerable to disease, predation, and other environmental changes.

References

External links

Galápagos penguins from the International Penguin Conservation website
BirdLife species factsheet
Penguin World: Galápagos penguin

Galápagos penguin
Endemic birds of the Galápagos Islands
Galápagos Islands coastal fauna
Galápagos penguin